The 2012 Summer Olympics (officially the Games of the XXX Olympiad and also known as London 2012) was an international multi-sport event held from 27 July to 12 August 2012 in London, England, United Kingdom. The first event, the group stage in women's football, began on 25 July at the Millennium Stadium in Cardiff, Wales, followed by the opening ceremony on 27 July. There were 10,768 athletes from 204 National Olympic Committees (NOCs) who participated in the 2012 Olympics.

Following a bid headed by former Olympic champion Sebastian Coe and the then-London mayor Ken Livingstone, London was selected as the host city at the 117th IOC Session in Singapore on 6 July 2005, defeating bids from Moscow, New York City, Madrid, and Paris. London became the first city to host the modern Olympics three times, having previously hosted the Summer Games in 1908 and 1948. Construction for the Games involved considerable redevelopment, with an emphasis on sustainability. The main focus was a new  Olympic Park, constructed on a former industrial site in Stratford, East London. The Games also made use of venues that already existed before the bid.

The United States topped the medal table, winning the most gold medals (46) and the highest number of medals overall (104). China finished second with a total of 91 medals (38 gold) and Great Britain came third with 65 medals overall (29 gold). Michael Phelps of the United States became the most decorated Olympic athlete of all time, winning his 22nd medal. Saudi Arabia, Qatar and Brunei entered female athletes for the first time, meaning that every currently eligible country has now sent a female competitor to at least one Olympic Games. Women's boxing was included for the first time, and the 2012 Games became the first at which every sport had female competitors.

The Games received considerable praise for their organisation, with the volunteers, the British military and public enthusiasm commended particularly highly. The opening ceremony, directed by Academy Award winner Danny Boyle, received widespread acclaim. These were the final Olympic Games under the IOC presidency of Belgian Jacques Rogge, who was succeeded by German Thomas Bach the next year.

A number of countries won their first Olympic medals, Bahrain, Botswana, Cyprus, Gabon, Grenada, Guatemala and Montenegro, with Bahrain and Grenada's winning gold medals for their first Olympic medals.

Bidding process

London was chosen over Birmingham to represent Great Britain's bid by the British Olympic Association.

By 15 July 2003—the deadline for interested cities to submit bids to the International Olympic Committee (IOC)—nine cities had submitted bids to host the 2012 Summer Olympics: Havana, Istanbul, Leipzig, London, Madrid, Moscow, New York City, Paris, and Rio de Janeiro. On 18 May 2004, as a result of a scored technical evaluation, the IOC reduced the number of cities to five: London, Madrid, Moscow, New York and Paris. All five submitted their candidate files by 19 November 2004 and were visited by the IOC inspection team during February and March 2005. The Paris bid suffered two setbacks during the IOC inspection visit: a number of strikes and demonstrations coinciding with the visits, and a report that a key member of the bid team, Guy Drut, would face charges over alleged corrupt party political finances.

Throughout the process, Paris was widely seen as the favourite, particularly as this was its third bid in recent years. London was initially seen as lagging behind Paris by a considerable margin. Its position began to improve after the appointment of Lord Coe as the new chair of the London Organising Committee of the Olympic and Paralympic Games (LOCOG) on 19 May 2004. In late August 2004, reports predicted a tie between London and Paris.

On 6 June 2005, the IOC released its evaluation reports for the five candidate cities. They did not contain any scores or rankings, but the report for Paris was considered the most positive. London was close behind, having closed most of the gap observed by the initial evaluation in 2004. New York and Madrid also received very positive evaluations. On 1 July 2005, when asked who would win, Jacques Rogge said, "I cannot predict it since I don't know how the IOC members will vote. But my gut feeling tells me that it will be very close. Perhaps it will come down to a difference of say ten votes, or maybe less."

On 6 July 2005, the final selection was announced at the 117th IOC Session in Singapore. Moscow was the first city to be eliminated, followed by New York and Madrid. The final two contenders were London and Paris. At the end of the fourth round of voting, London won the right to host the 2012 Games with 54 votes to 50.

The celebrations in London were short-lived, being overshadowed by bombings on London's transport system less than 24 hours after the announcement.

Development and preparation

The London Organising Committee of the Olympic Games (LOCOG) was created to oversee the staging of the Games, and held its first board meeting on 3 October 2005. The committee, chaired by Lord Coe, was in charge of implementing and staging the Games, while the Olympic Delivery Authority (ODA), established in April 2006, was in charge of construction of the venues and infrastructure.

The Government Olympic Executive (GOE), a unit within the Department for Culture, Media and Sport (DCMS), was the lead government body for coordinating the London 2012 Olympics. It focused on oversight of the Games, cross-programme management, and the London 2012 Olympic Legacy before and after the Games that would benefit London and the wider United Kingdom. The organisation was also responsible for the supervision of the £9.3 billion of public sector funding.

In August 2011, security concerns arose surrounding the hosting of the Olympic Games in London, following the 2011 England riots. Some countries expressed safety concerns, despite the IOC's assurance that the riots would not affect the Games.

The IOC's Coordination Commission for the 2012 Games completed its tenth and final visit to London in March 2012. Its members concluded that "London is ready to host the world this summer".

Venues

The 2012 Olympic and Paralympic Games used a mixture of new venues, existing and historic facilities, and temporary facilities, some of them in well-known locations such as Hyde Park and Horse Guards Parade. After the Games, some of the new facilities would be reused in their Olympic form, while others will be resized or relocated.

The majority of venues were divided into three zones within Greater London: the Olympic Zone, the River Zone and the Central Zone. The football tournament was staged at several grounds around the UK. Work began on the Park in December 2006, when a sports hall in Eton Manor was pulled down. The athletes' village in Portland was completed in September 2011.

In November 2004, the 200-hectare (500-acre) Olympic Park plans were revealed. The plans for the site were approved in September 2004 by Tower Hamlets, Newham, Hackney and Waltham Forest. The redevelopment of the area to build the Olympic Park required compulsory purchase orders of property. The London Development Agency was in dispute with London and Continental Railways about the orders in November 2005. By May 2006, 86% of the land had been bought as businesses fought eviction. Residents who opposed the eviction tried to find ways to stop it by setting up campaigns, but they had to leave as 94% of land was bought and the other 6% bought as a £9 billion regeneration project started.

There were some issues with the original venues not being challenging enough or being financially unviable. Both the Olympic road races and the mountain bike event were initially considered to be too easy, so they were eventually scheduled on new locations. The Olympic marathon course, which was set to finish in the Olympic stadium, was moved to The Mall, since closing Tower Bridge was deemed to cause traffic problems in central London. North Greenwich Arena 2 was scrapped in a cost-cutting exercise, Wembley Arena being used for badminton and rhythmic gymnastics events instead.

Test events were held throughout 2011 and 2012, either through an existing championship such as 2012 Wimbledon Championships or as a specially created event held under the banner of London Prepares.

Team GB House was the British Olympic Association's operational HQ up to and during the 2012 Olympic and Paralympic Games. Designed by architects Gebler Tooth on the top floor of an office building in Westfield Stratford City, it combined the team HQ, athletes' "Friends and Family" lounge, Press Centre, and VIP lounge.

Public transport

London's public transport scored poorly in the IOC's initial evaluation; however, it felt that, if the improvements were delivered in time for the Games, London would cope. Transport for London (TfL) carried out numerous improvements in preparation for 2012, including the expansion of the London Overground's East London Line, upgrades to the Docklands Light Railway and the North London Line, and the introduction of a new "Javelin" high-speed rail service. According to Network Rail, an additional 4,000 train services operated during the Games, and train operators ran longer trains during the day. During the Games, Stratford International station was not served by any international services (just as it had not been before the Games), westbound trains did not stop at Hackney Wick railway station, and Pudding Mill Lane DLR station closed entirely during the Games.

TfL also built a £25 million cable car across the River Thames, called the Emirates Air Line, to link 2012 Olympics venues. It was inaugurated in June 2012 and crosses the Thames between Greenwich Peninsula and the Royal Docks, carrying up to 2,500 passengers an hour, cutting journey times between the O2 arena and the ExCeL exhibition centre and providing a crossing every 30 seconds.

The plan was to have 80% of athletes travel less than 20 minutes to their event and 93% of them within 30 minutes of their event. The Olympic Park would be served by ten separate railway lines with a combined capacity of 240,000 passengers per hour. In addition, LOCOG planned for 90% of the venues to be served by three or more types of public transport. Two park-and-ride sites off the M25 with a combined capacity of 12,000 cars were 25 minutes away from the Olympic Park. Another park-and-ride site was planned in Ebbsfleet with a capacity for 9,000 cars where spectators could board a 10-minute shuttle train service. To get spectators to Eton Dorney, four park-and-ride schemes were set up. These Park and Ride services were operated by First Games Transport.

TfL defined a network of roads leading between venues as the Olympic Route Network; roads connecting all of the Olympic venues located within London. Many of these roads also contained special "Olympic lanes" marked with the Olympic ringsreserved for the use of Olympic athletes, officials, and other VIPs during the Games. Members of the public driving in an Olympic lane were subject to a fine of £130. Additionally, London buses would not include roads with Olympic lanes on their routes. The painting of Olympic lane indicators in mid-July led to confusion from commuters, who wrongly believed that the Olympic lane restrictions had already taken effect (they were to take effect on 27 July). The A4 experienced traffic jams due to drivers avoiding the Olympic lane, and likewise on a section of Southampton Row, where the only lanes available in one direction were the Olympic lane and the bus lane.

Concerns were expressed at the logistics of spectators travelling to the events outside London. In particular, the sailing events at Portland had no direct motorway connections, and local roads are heavily congested by tourist traffic in the summer. However, a £77 million relief road connecting Weymouth to Dorchester was built and opened in 2011. Some £16 million was put aside for the rest of the improvements.

TfL created a promotional campaign and website, Get Ahead of the Games, to help provide information related to transport during the Olympics and Paralympics. Through the campaign, TfL also encouraged the use of cycling as a mode of transport during the Games. However, despite this encouragement to use bicycles, members of the public protested that riding bikes on London roads would be more dangerous due to the blocked Olympic lanes, and also protested against a decision to close the Lea Valley towpath during the Olympics and Paralympics due to security concerns.

International transport
The 2012 Games were a unique operational task and a massive challenge for Heathrow airport. A temporary terminal was created at Heathrow Airport to be used by 10,100 departing athletes after the Games. Up to 35% more bags than normal were expected on 13 August, which was predicted to be the busiest day in the airport's history, according to Nick Cole, head of Olympic and Paralympic planning at Heathrow.

Cost and financing
A study from Oxford University found that the sports-related costs of London 2012 amounted to US$15 billion, compared with $4.6 billion for Rio 2016, $40–44 billion for Beijing 2008, and $51 billion for Sochi 2014 (the most expensive Olympics in history). London 2012 went over budget by 76% in real terms, measured from bid to completion. Cost per athlete was $1.4 million. This does not include wider costs for urban and transport infrastructure, which often equal or exceed the sports-related costs.

The costs of staging the Games were separate from those for building the venues and infrastructure and redeveloping the land for the Olympic Park. While the Games were privately funded, the venues and infrastructure were largely financed using public money.

According to The Wall Street Journal, the original budget for the Games was increased to about £9.3 billion (US$15.28 billion) in 2007. The revised figures were announced to the House of Commons on 15 March 2007 by Tessa Jowell. Along with East End regeneration costs, the breakdown was:
 Building the venues and infrastructure – £5.3 billion
 Elite sport and Paralympic funding – £400 million
 Security and policing – £600 million
 Regeneration of the Lower Lea Valley – £1.7 billion
 Contingency fund – £2.7 billion

Volunteers
Unpaid volunteers known as Games Makers performed a variety of tasks before and during the Games. A target of 70,000 volunteers was set as early as 2004. When recruitment took place in 2010, more than 240,000 applications were received. Sebastian Coe said in February 2012, "Our Games Makers will contribute a total of around eight million volunteer hours during the Games and the Games simply wouldn't happen without them". The volunteers wore clothing that included purple and red polo shirts and jackets, beige trousers, grey socks and grey-and-white trainers, which they collected from the Uniform Distribution and Accreditation Centre. Volunteers also wore photo accreditation badges that were also worn by officials, athletes, family members and media, which gained them access to specific venues and buildings around the site.

Ticketing
Organisers estimated that some 8 million tickets would be available for the Olympic Games, and 1.5 million tickets for the Paralympic Games. LOCOG aimed to raise £375–£400 million in ticket sales. There were also free events such as marathon, triathlon and road cycling, although, for the first time in Olympic history, the sailing events were ticketed. Eventually, more than 7,000,000 tickets were sold. Following IOC rules, people applied for tickets from the NOC of their country of residence. European Union residents were able to apply for tickets in any EU country.

In Great Britain, ticket prices ranged from £20 for many events to £2,012 for the most expensive seats at the opening ceremony. Some free tickets were given to military personnel as part of the Tickets For Troops scheme, as well as to survivors and families of those who died during 7 July 2005 London bombings. Initially, people were able to apply for tickets via a website from 15 March until 26 April 2011. There was a huge demand for tickets, with a demand of more than three times the number of tickets available. The process was widely criticised as more than 50% of the sessions went to a random ballot, and over half the people who applied got no tickets. On 11 May 2012 a round of nearly one million "second chance" tickets went on sale over a 10-day period between 23 June and 3 July 2011. About 1.7 million tickets were available for football and 600,000 for other sports, including archery, field hockey, football, judo, boxing and volleyball. Although technical difficulties were encountered, ten sports had sold out by 8 am of the first day.

Countdown

During the closing ceremony of the 2008 Olympics, the Olympic Flag was formally handed over from the Mayor of Beijing to the Mayor of London. This was followed by a section highlighting London, One month later, the Olympic and Paralympic flags were raised outside the London City Hall.

A countdown clock in Trafalgar Square was unveiled, 500 days before the Games. The clock broke down the following day, but was later fixed. It was a two-sided clock with the Paralympic countdown on the other side.
The countdown to the start of the Olympics began with a ceremony for the lighting of the Olympic flame in Olympia, Greece.

Security

The police led the security operation, with 10,000 officers available, supported by 13,500 members of the armed forces. Naval and air assets, including ships situated in the Thames, Typhoon fighter jets and surface-to-air missiles, were deployed as part of the security operation, named Operation Olympics by the Ministry of Defence; the biggest security operation Britain had faced for decades. The cost of security increased from £282 million to £553 million, and the figure of 13,500 armed forces personnel was more than Britain currently had deployed in Afghanistan. The Metropolitan Police and the Royal Marines carried out security exercises in preparation for the Olympics on 19 January 2012, with 50 marine police officers in rigid inflatables and fast response boats, joined by up to 100 military personnel and a Royal Navy Lynx helicopter.

The Ministry of Defence distributed leaflets to residents of the Lexington building in Bow, announcing that a missile system was to be stationed on top of the water tower. This caused concern to some residents. The Ministry said it probably would use Starstreak missiles and that site evaluations had taken place, but that no final decision had taken place.

Medals

Approximately 4,700 Olympic and Paralympic medals were produced by the Royal Mint at Llantrisant. They were designed by David Watkins (Olympics) and Lin Cheung (Paralympics). 99% of the gold, silver and copper was donated by Rio Tinto from a mine in Salt Lake County, Utah in the U.S. The remaining 1% came from a Mongolian mine. The obverse, as is traditional, features Nike, the Greek goddess of victory, stepping from the Panathinaiko Stadium that hosted the first modern Olympic Games in 1896, with Parthenon in the background; the reverse features the Games logo, the River Thames and a series of lines representing "the energy of athletes and a sense of pulling together". The medals were transferred to the Tower of London vaults on 2 July 2012 for storage.

Each gold medal is 92.5 percent silver and 1.34 percent gold, with the remainder copper. The silver medal is 92.5 percent silver, with the remainder copper. The bronze medal is made up of 97 percent copper, 2.5 percent zinc, and 0.5 per cent tin. The value of the materials in the gold medal was about £410 (US$644), the silver about £210 (US$330), and the bronze about £3 (US$4.71) as of 30 July 2012.

Torch relay

The Olympics torch relay ran from 19 May to 27 July 2012, before the Games. Plans for the relay were developed in 2010–11, with the torch-bearer selection process announced on 18 May 2011. The torch was designed by Edward Barber and Jay Osgerby.

On 18 May 2012 the Olympic flame arrived at RNAS Culdrose in Cornwall from Greece on flight BA2012, operated by a British Airways Airbus A319 named "Firefly".

The torch had three days outside the United Kingdom when it visited the Isle of Man on 2 June, Dublin in Ireland, on 6 June, and both Guernsey and Jersey on 15 July.

The relay focused on National Heritage Sites, locations with sporting significance, key sporting events, schools registered with the Get Set School Network, green spaces and biodiversity, Live Sites (city locations with large screens), and festivals and other events. Dumfries and Galloway was the only Region in the whole of the United Kingdom that had the Olympic Torch pass through it twice. A group of young athletes, nominated by retired Olympic athletes, ran the torch around the stadium. These torchbearers were Callum Airlie, Jordan Duckitt, Desiree Henry, Katie Kirk, Cameron MacRitchie, Aidan Reynolds, and Adelle Tracey. Together the torchbearers each lit a petal that spread the fire to the 204 petals of the cauldron, representing the countries that participated in the Games. The cauldron was designed by Thomas Heatherwick.

Environmental policy
The Olympic Park was planned to incorporate 45 hectares of wildlife habitat, with a total of 525 bird boxes and 150 bat boxes. Local waterways and riverbanks were enhanced as part of the process. Renewable energy also featured at the Olympics. It was originally planned to provide 20% of the energy for the Olympic Park and Village from renewable technologies; however, only 9% of it was achieved. Proposals to meet the original target included large-scale on-site wind turbines and hydroelectric generators in the River Thames. These plans were scrapped for safety reasons. The focus subsequently moved to installing solar panels on some buildings, and providing the opportunity to recover energy from waste. Food packaging at the Olympics was made from compostable materials – like starch and cellulose-based bioplastics – where it cannot be reused or recycled. This included fast-food wrappers, sandwich boxes and drink cartons. After they had been used, many of these materials were suitable for anaerobic digestion (AD), allowing them to be made into renewable energy.

Buildings like the Water Polo Arena were, post-event, relocated elsewhere. Building parts like roofing covers and membranes of different temporary venues were recycled via Vinyloop. This allowed organisers to meet the standards of the Olympic Delivery Authority concerning environmental protection.

London 2012 inaugurated Olympic Games guidelines that included the recycling of PVC, which was used for temporary buildings such as the Basketball Arena and for the temporary parts of permanent venues such as the Olympic Stadium. In the Water Polo Arena, PVC roofing was made from recycled cushions to provide insulation. Through this recycling process, the Olympic Games PVC Policy was fulfilled. It says that

Where London 2012 procures PVC for temporary usage or where permanent usage is not assured, London 2012 is required to ensure that there is a take-back scheme that offers a closed-loop reuse system or mechanical recycling system for post-consumer waste.

"The majority of temporary facilities created for the Olympic Games including the Aquatic centre temporary stands, basketball arena, Water Polo Arena, and the shooting facilities at the Royal Artillery Barracks, are essentially big tents. Basically, PVC stretched over lightweight steel frame. This design solution makes them efficient to install, reduces the need for any significant foundations and are, of course, reusable. We were challenged by the public around the use of PVC; but we considered it to be the right material for certain functions. We therefore challenged the PVC supply chain to have certain environmental performance criteria in place, including a take back and recycle scheme" said Kirsten Henson, Materials Manager for the London 2012 Olympic Park.

Cultural Olympiad

The Olympic Charter, the set of rules and guidelines for the organization of the Olympic Games and for governing the Olympic Movement, states that
LOCOG shall organise a programme of cultural events which must cover at least the entire period during which the Olympic Village is open.

The Cultural Olympiad comprised many programmes, with more than 500 events spread over four years across the whole of the United Kingdom, and culminating in the London 2012 Festival.

Opening ceremony

The opening ceremony officially began at 9:00 pm British Summer Time (UTC+1) on 27 July in the Olympic Stadium and was called "Isles of Wonder". Oscar-winning director Danny Boyle was its artistic director, with music direction by Rick Smith of Underworld.

The Games were officially opened by Queen Elizabeth II, accompanied by Prince Philip, Duke of Edinburgh. It was the second Olympic Games opened personally by the Queen, the first being in 1976 in Montreal. The ceremony included a short comic film starring Daniel Craig as secret agent James Bond and the Queen as herself, and another starring Rowan Atkinson as Mr. Bean.

Live musical performers included Frank Turner, Dame Evelyn Glennie, Mike Oldfield, the London Symphony Orchestra, Dizzee Rascal, Arctic Monkeys, and Sir Paul McCartney who performed "Hey Jude" as the closing act. The ceremony transmitted live on BBC One attracted a peak viewing audience of over 27 million in the UK.

Closing ceremony

The closing ceremony was held on 12 August. It featured a flashback fiesta to British music with The Who closing the performance. The ceremony also included a handover of the Olympic flag by Boris Johnson, Mayor of London, to Eduardo Paes, Mayor of Rio de Janeiro, the host city of the 2016 Summer Olympics.

The Games

Participating National Olympic Committees

Around 10,700 athletes from 204 National Olympic Committees (NOCs) took part, (85 countries acquired at least one medal: gold, silver or bronze) surpassing the 1948 Summer Olympics in London and the 2002 Commonwealth Games in Manchester as the largest multi-sport event ever to be held in the United Kingdom.

Three athletes from the Netherlands Antilles Olympic Committee, which the IOC Executive Committee had ceased to recognise at the IOC session of July 2011, and one athlete from South Sudan, which had no recognized NOC until 2015, participated independently under the Olympic flag.

National houses

During the Games, some countries and continents had a "national house". These temporary meeting places for supporters, athletes and other followers were located throughout London.

Sports
The 2012 Summer Olympics featured 26 different sports encompassing 39 disciplines and 302 events. In the list below, the number of events in each discipline is noted in parentheses.

Women's boxing was included in the programme for the first time, and 36 women competed in three weight classes. There was a special dispensation for the shooting events, which would otherwise have been illegal under UK gun law. In tennis, mixed doubles returned to the Olympic programme for the first time since 1924.

London's bid featured the same 28 sports that had been included in other recent Summer Olympics, but the IOC voted to drop baseball and softball from the 2012 Games just two days after London had been selected as the host city. There was an appeal, but the IOC voted to uphold the decision, and the two sports were scheduled to be discontinued after their last appearance at the 2008 Olympics. The IOC then voted on whether or not to replace them; karate, squash, golf, roller sports and rugby sevens were considered. Karate and squash were the two final nominees, but neither received enough votes to reach the required two-thirds majority.

Although formal demonstration sports were eliminated after the 1992 Summer Olympics, special tournaments for non-Olympic sports can be run during the Games, such as the Wushu tournament at the 2008 Summer Olympics. There were attempts to run Twenty20 cricket and netball tournaments alongside the 2012 Games, but neither campaign was successful.

Calendar

The final official schedule was released on 15 February 2011.

Records

These Olympic Games resulted in 32 world records in eight sports. The largest number of records were set in swimming, at eight. China, Great Britain and the United States set the most records, at five each.

Medal table 

A total of 85 National Olympic Committees (NOCs) won medals, 54 of those countries winning at least one gold medal. Seven NOCs won their first ever Olympic medal: Bahrain (gold), Botswana (silver), Cyprus (silver), Gabon (silver), Grenada (gold), Guatemala (silver), and Montenegro (silver). The United States finished at the top of the table, winning 47 gold medals and a total of 104 medals. China finished second with 38 gold medals and 91 medals overall, and hosts Great Britain came in third place, winning 29 gold medals and 65 medals overall in their best performance since London hosted its first Summer Olympics in 1908, pushing Russia—who won 18 gold medals and 66 medals in total, after doping redistributions (initially 24 gold and 82 total)—into fourth place.

Key
 Changes in medal standings (see subpage)

Podium sweeps

Broadcasting

The host broadcaster was Olympic Broadcasting Services (OBS), an agency of the IOC. The OBS used its own cameras and crews subcontracted from other Olympic broadcasters to cover the events. The base video and audio were sold to other broadcasters, who added their own commentary and presentation.

The official recording format of the 2012 Summer Olympics used Panasonic's digital technologies. The official video was produced and distributed from the International Broadcast Centre in 1080/50i High-Definition (HD) format. Panasonic announced that DVCPRO HD would be the official recording format. OBS London used P2 HD shoulder-mount camcorders.

The IOC wanted television coverage to reach as broad a worldwide audience as possible, and several national and regional broadcasters covered London 2012. In the UK, the BBC carried the Olympics and Channel 4 the Paralympics. The BBC aimed to broadcast all 5,000 hours of the Games. BBC Parliament's Freeview channel was suspended, BBC Three's on-air time was extended so that it could show Olympic events in the daytime, and 24 additional BBC Olympics channels were available via cable, satellite and the internet in the UK.

The US television rights, owned by NBC, accounted for more than half the rights revenue for the IOC. Despite high viewership, many viewers were disappointed with NBC's coverage. The operations of broadcasters granted rights to the Games were hosted in the dedicated International Broadcast Centre inside the security cordon of the Olympic Park. YouTube planned to stream the Games in 64 territories in Asia and Sub-Saharan Africa where there were no official broadcasters.

In Sri Lanka a dispute occurred between Sri Lanka Rupavahini Corporation (SLRC) and MBC Networks (MTV/MBC) as to who was the official broadcaster of the Games. This problem was caused as Asia-Pacific Broadcasting Union (ABU) had offered the official broadcasting rights to both networks, as both of the networks were ABU members. So SLRC filed a case against MBC Networks for broadcasting rights at the Colombo Magistrate's Court. Considering the case, the court issued a special court order preventing MBC Networks' Olympic broadcast and stated that SLRC should be the sole broadcaster. However, when the Games started, both networks broadcast most of the events simultaneously. Another dispute had previously occurred between Carlton Sports Network (CSN) and SLRC, but the Sports Minister, Mahindananda Aluthgamage, had stated that SLRC had the exclusive rights.

Olympic Golden Rings Awards
In November 2012, the IOC announced the winners of the Golden Ring Awards for the best broadcast coverage of the Games. Best Olympic Sports Production was awarded to the sailing, produced by Christopher Lincoln, Gary Milkis, and Ursula Romero. The production for the canoe/kayak slalom and the rowing/canoe sprint came second and third respectively. The award for Best On Air Promotion went to NBC with Foxtel and ZDF finishing second and third. NBC Olympics also won the Best Olympic Feature category, as Sky Italia came second and ZDF third. The Best Athlete Profile award went to TV Record's profile of Sarah Menezes, NBC came second with their profile of David Rudisha, and ESPN Latin America took third place with a profile of Miguel Correa and Ruben Rezola. The award for Best Olympic Programme went to NBC, host broadcasters the BBC took second place for Super Saturday (the middle Saturday of the Games), and third place was claimed by the Nine Network for their live coverage of Day 16 of the Games.

Marketing

"Survival" by Muse was announced as the official song of the Olympics, to be played by international broadcasters reporting on the Games. In August 2009, the Royal Mail commissioned artists and illustrators to design 30 stamps, which were released in batches of 10 between 2009 and 2011. The last ones were released on 22 July 2011. Two £5 coins designed by Saiman Miah have been made to commemorate the Olympics. As with other Olympics since 1952, the Royal Mint will strike a set of commemorative one-kilogram gold and silver coins.

Motto
The official motto for the 2012 Summer Olympics is "Inspire a generation". It was chosen to highlight the organisers' commitment to inspire the world, including younger generations, to get involved in sporting events through the Games' legacy.

Logo and graphics
There have been two London 2012 logos: one used for the bidding process, and the other used in the branding for the Games themselves. The bid logo, created by Kino Design, was a ribbon with blue, yellow, black, green, and red stripes winding through the text "LONDON 2012", making the shape of the River Thames in East London. The main logo, designed by Wolff Olins and published on 4 June 2007, is a representation of the number 2012, with the Olympic Rings embedded within the zero.

Public reaction to the main logo in a June 2007 BBC poll was largely negative; more than 80% of votes gave it the lowest possible rating. Several newspapers ran their own logo competitions, displaying alternative submissions from their readers, and several writers from news agencies criticised the logo. A segment of animated footage released at the same time as the logo was reported to trigger seizures in a small number of people with photosensitive epilepsy, and a short segment was removed from the London 2012 website in response. It was suggested that the logo resembled the American cartoon characters Lisa Simpson and Bart Simpson performing fellatio.
In February 2011, Iran threatened to boycott the Olympics, complaining that the logo appeared to spell out the word "Zion". However, this boycott did not occur.

The official London 2012 Olympic typeface was called Headline 2012 and also suffered some criticism. Journalist Simon Garfield made it number 1 in the list of the "8 Worst Fonts in the World" in his 2010 book Just My Type, commenting that "the uncool font is based on jaggedness and crudeness", although he conceded that it was "a brilliant piece of corporate branding". The magazine Wired pointed out that the typeface was intended for "awareness, impact and memorability as a headline typeface" rather than elegance or readability in long sections of text.

Colours 
 The four main colours used in the branding of the Games were pink, blue, green, and orange. These colours were chosen to showcase the spirit of the Games: energetic, spirited, youthful, and bright.

 The auxiliary colours used in the branding were dark purple, grey, and gold. These were mostly used in symbols and graphics to offset the brightness of the main colours.

Mascots

The official mascots for the 2012 Summer Olympics and Paralympic Games were unveiled on 19 May 2010. Wenlock and Mandeville are animations depicting two drops of steel from a steelworks in Bolton. They are named after Much Wenlock, a town in Shropshire that holds a forerunner of the current Olympic Games, and Stoke Mandeville, a village in Buckinghamshire where a forerunner of the Paralympic Games was first held. The writer Michael Morpurgo wrote the story concept for the mascots, and an animation was produced. Two stories have been created about the mascots: Out Of A Rainbow and Adventures On A Rainbow.

Creative Review magazine liked the mascots, but elsewhere their design was greeted with some disdain. One columnist jested that they were the product of a "drunken one-night stand between a Teletubby and a Dalek". Others have compared them to Izzy, the much disparaged mascot of the 1996 Atlanta Summer Olympics. Still others have likened them to Kang and Kodos from The Simpsons. However, the mascots' creators claim that young people find the duo appealing.

Chariots of Fire
The 1981 Best Picture Oscar–winning film Chariots of Fire, which tells the story of two British athletes in the 1924 Olympics, was a recurring theme in promotions for the 2012 Olympics. A digitally re-mastered version of Chariots of Fire was released on 13 July 2012 and screened in over 100 UK cinemas as part of the celebrations, and a 2012 stage adaptation ran in London theatres from 9 May 2012 to 5 January 2013. The film's theme tune was performed during the opening ceremony by the London Symphony Orchestra, conducted by Simon Rattle. The performance was accompanied by a comedic skit by Rowan Atkinson, which included the opening beach-running footage from the film. A new orchestration of the film's theme tune was played during each medal presentation of the Games.

Sponsors

LOCOG and the IOC agreed sponsorship deals with several companies, each assigned to one of four categories; worldwide, tier one, tier two and tier three. The worldwide partners were: Acer, Atos, Coca-Cola, Dow, General Electric, McDonald's, Omega SA, Panasonic, Procter & Gamble, Samsung and Visa. Tier one partners were: Adidas, BMW, BP, British Airways, BT Group, EDF Energy and Lloyds TSB. The tier two partners were: Adecco, ArcelorMittal, Cadbury, Deloitte, Thomas Cook Group, Cisco Systems and United Parcel Service. Tier three partners were: Aggreko, Airwave, Atkins, The Boston Consulting Group, CBS Outdoor, Crystal CG, Eurostar, Freshfields Bruckhaus Deringer, G4S, GlaxoSmithKline, Gymnova, Heathrow Airport, Heineken, Holiday Inn, John Lewis & Partners, McCann Worldgroup, Mondo, Nature Valley, Next, Nielsen Company, Populous (company), Rapiscan Systems, Rio Tinto (corporation), Technogym, Thames Water, Ticketmaster, Trebor and Westfield Group. The companies provided £1.4 billion of funding altogether, allocated evenly between the IOC and LOCOG.

Controversies

During the lead-up to the Games, there were controversies over sponsorship, the athletes' use of social media, and several political issues. After a complicated lottery process, thousands of people failed to secure seats for the events they wanted, but a large number of empty seats were observed throughout the Games, even at some of the most popular events. There was speculation that this was due to a failure of corporate sponsors to make use of tickets they had received.

During the Games, eight competitors in the badminton women's doubles were disqualified for "not using best efforts", when they tried to lose matches in the group stage to obtain more favourable fixtures in the knockout rounds. A number of results in boxing, gymnastics and judo were overturned by officials after initial decisions were appealed against.

Ye Shiwen faced doping allegations after her gold medal in the women's 400m Individual Medley as she came from being behind the world record in the final 50m to beating it by 1.02 seconds. Furthermore, she swam her last 50m 0.17 seconds quicker than the men's winner of the corresponding race. All charges were later dropped.

Just before the start of the Men's 100m Final, a spectator threw a plastic bottle into Tyson Gay's lane, intended to hit Usain Bolt who was three lanes outside in Lane 7. The race was unaffected, and Bolt would go on to become the second man in history to defend a 100m Olympic title. The spectator, later identified as Ashley Gill-Webb, was soon arrested after he was struck on the head by Dutch judoka and bronze medalist Edith Bosch, whom he happened to be sitting next to. LOCOG Chairman Sebastian Coe later stated: "I'm not suggesting vigilantism, but it was actually poetic justice that they happened to be sitting next to a judo player". Gill-Webb later pleaded not guilty to a charge of using threatening words or behaviour with intent to cause harassment, alarm or distress at Stratford Magistrates' Court. He was later found guilty.

Iran lodged a formal complaint with the International Olympic Committee after they claimed that the logo spelt the word 'Zion'. The complaint was dismissed by the president of the IOC, Jacques Rogge, who said that the complaint "can't be serious."

Drug testing

It was announced before the Summer Games that half of all the competitors would be tested for drugs, with 150 scientists set to take 6,000 samples between the start of the Games and the end of the Paralympic Games. Every competitor who won a medal was also tested. The Olympic laboratory tested up to 400 samples every day for more than 240 prohibited substances. As of late 2022, 40 medals have been stripped due to doping violations, 17 of which were originally awarded to Russian athletes.

Testing for drugs was completed by GSK (GlaxoSmithKline).

See also 

 2012 Olympic hunger summit
 Twenty Twelve, a comedy mockumentary featuring a fictional London Olympics committee

Notes

References

Further reading 
 
 
 
 Pamment, James. "'Putting the GREAT Back into Britain': National Identity, Public-Private Collaboration & Transfers of Brand Equity in 2012's Global Promotional Campaign," British Journal of Politics & International Relations (2015) 17#2 pp 260–283.
 Surowiec, Pawel. and Philip Long. “Hybridity and Soft Power Statecraft: The 'GREAT' Campaign.” Diplomacy & Statecraft 31:1 (2020): 1-28. online review https://doi.org/10.1080/09592296.2020.1721092

Official reports

Book references

External links

Official
 
 
News media
 
 
 
 

 
2012
2012
2012
2012 in British sport
2012 in multi-sport events
2012 sports events in London
August 2012 sports events in the United Kingdom
July 2012 sports events in the United Kingdom